Kakegurui is a 2018 Japanese television drama based on the manga of the same name. Released a year after an anime based on the same manga, the series was broadcast for ten episodes on MBS and TBS from January to March 2018; a second five-episode season was broadcast in April 2019. It was followed by a film adaptation, featuring the same actors, released in May 2019. The series became available for streaming on Netflix in the United States and United Kingdom in May 2018; in Japan in July 2018; and in the Philippines in February 2020.

Plot
Hyakkaou Private Academy is a century-old prestigious institution. Students are ranked by their gambling winnings. Yumeko Jabami transfers to Hyakkaou Private Academy and disrupts the students' success.

Cast

Main cast includes:
 Minami Hamabe as Yumeko Jabami
 Mahiro Takasugi as Ryota Suzui
 Aoi Morikawa as Mary Saotome
 Taishi Nakagawa as Kaede Manyuda
 Yuma Yamoto as Jun Kiwatari
 Natsume Mito as Runa Yomotsuki
 Yurika Nakamura as Sayaka Igarashi
 Ruka Matsuda as Itsuki Sumeragi
 Natsumi Okamoto as Yuriko Nishinotouin
 Kiyo Matsumoto as Nanami Tsubomi
 Miki Yanagi as Midari Ikishima

Introduced in season 2 are the following actors:
 Sayuri Matsumura as Yumemi Yumemite
 Elaiza Ikeda as Kirari Momobami
 Ikeda also plays Ririka Momobami

Development and release
The live-action drama adaptation was first announced on November 21, 2017. The drama was first broadcast on MBS on January 14, 2018, and TBS' slot Dramaism on January 16, 2018.

The first season opening theme is sung by Re:versed titled  while the theme song titled "Strawberry Feels" is sung by BIGMAMA. Tsutomu Hanabusa directed the drama. 
 
After the live-action series premiered in Japan on January 14, 2018, it became available for streaming on Netflix in the United States and United Kingdom in early May, 2018. It became available in the Philippines on February 1, 2020, and Netflix Japan on July 2, 2018. The drama was streamed on Netflix in Japanese with subtitles including English, Spanish, Chinese, and Thai in May 2018.

In January 2019, the theme song "mummy mummy" for the second live-action season was released, by the rock band Bigmama. Passcode performed the opening song "Ichi ka Bachi ka" (All or Nothing). The second season premiered on April 1, 2019 on MBS and TBS, and ran for five episodes. The second season streamed on Netflix in July 2019. A film adaptation featuring the same actors was developed and released in May 2019.

Series overview

Episode list

Kakegurui (2018)

Kakegurui:season 2 (2019)

References

External links
  
 

2018 Japanese television series debuts
2019 Japanese television series endings